The 112th United States Congress began on January 3, 2011. There were 13 new senators (one Democrat, 12 Republicans) and 94 new representatives (nine Democrats, 85 Republicans) at the start of its first session. Additionally, three senators (one Democrat, two Republicans) and 10 representatives (seven Democrats, three Republicans) took office on various dates in order to fill vacancies during the 112th Congress before it ended on January 3, 2013.

The president of the House Democratic freshman class was Terri Sewell of Alabama, while the president of the House Republican freshman class was Austin Scott of Georgia. Additionally, the Republican's freshmen liaisons were Kristi Noem of South Dakota and Tim Scott of South Carolina.

This freshmen class was overwhelmingly Republican, resulting in an even larger prevalence of Republican freshmen than during the Republican Revolution of 1994, with approximately 23% of the 47 elected Republican senators and 33% of the 242 elected Republican representatives being first-timers.

Senate

Took office January 3, 2011

Took office during the 112th Congress

House of Representatives

Took office January 3, 2011

Took office during the 112th Congress

See also 
 List of United States senators in the 112th Congress
 List of members of the United States House of Representatives in the 112th Congress by seniority

Notes

References

External links
RealClearPolitics: Freshman Class of the 112th Congress

Freshman class members
112